The Academy of the Sacred Heart is a private Catholic high school in New Orleans, Louisiana. It is located within the Archdiocese of New Orleans and was established in 1886 by the Society of the Sacred Heart.

Athletics
Academy of the Sacred Heart athletics competes in the LHSAA.

Alumnae 
Mignon Faget
Lucy Faust
Martha Gilmore Robinson (1888–1981), women's rights and civic activist
Desirée Rogers
Cokie Roberts

Notes and references

Private K-12 schools in New Orleans
Catholic secondary schools in New Orleans
Catholic elementary schools in Louisiana
Educational institutions established in 1886
1886 establishments in Louisiana
Sacred Heart schools in the United States
Girls' schools in Louisiana